Román Montañez is a Spanish professional basketball player, who plays for Mywigo Valladolid. His previous clubs include CB Girona.

Trophies

With Bàsquet Manresa
Liga ACB: (1)
 1998

With CB Girona
FIBA Eurocup: (1)
 2007

External links
ACB Profile

References

1979 births
Living people
Baloncesto Fuenlabrada players
Bàsquet Manresa players
BC Andorra players
Spanish expatriate basketball people in Andorra
Bilbao Basket players
CB Girona players
CB Valladolid players
Liga ACB players
Shooting guards
Spanish men's basketball players

Mediterranean Games gold medalists for Spain
Competitors at the 2001 Mediterranean Games
Mediterranean Games medalists in basketball